Albany Ward is an Auckland Council ward which elects two councillors and covers the Hibiscus and Bays and Upper Harbour Local Boards. The two councillors are currently John Watson and Wayne Walker.

Demographics

Albany ward had a population of 166,854 at the 2018 New Zealand census, an increase of 23,355 people (16.3%) since the 2013 census, and an increase of 42,123 people (33.8%) since the 2006 census. There were 56,415 households, comprising 81,522 males and 85,332 females, giving a sex ratio of 0.96 males per female. The median age was 38.8 years (compared with 37.4 years nationally), with 31,047 people (18.6%) aged under 15 years, 32,538 (19.5%) aged 15 to 29, 77,307 (46.3%) aged 30 to 64, and 25,962 (15.6%) aged 65 or older.

Ethnicities were 71.2% European/Pākehā, 6.0% Māori, 2.2% Pacific peoples, 24.9% Asian, and 3.3% other ethnicities. People may identify with more than one ethnicity.

The percentage of people born overseas was 44.2, compared with 27.1% nationally.

Although some people chose not to answer the census's question about religious affiliation, 52.7% had no religion, 36.0% were Christian, 0.2% had Māori religious beliefs, 1.6% were Hindu, 0.9% were Muslim, 1.4% were Buddhist and 1.6% had other religions.

Of those at least 15 years old, 40,245 (29.6%) people had a bachelor's or higher degree, and 14,676 (10.8%) people had no formal qualifications. The median income was $36,600, compared with $31,800 nationally. 31,788 people (23.4%) earned over $70,000 compared to 17.2% nationally. The employment status of those at least 15 was that 68,169 (50.2%) people were employed full-time, 20,235 (14.9%) were part-time, and 4,149 (3.1%) were unemployed.

Councillors

Election Results
Election Results for the Albany Ward:

2022 Election Results

References

Wards of the Auckland Region